Bernward Koch (born January 23, 1957 in Siegen) is a German composer, pianist and keyboardist.
Additionally, he plays percussion, bass, and guitar. His music mainly evokes a soothing and calming style, with a clearly recognizable melody from the piano, enriched with keyboards, flute, guitar and percussion. His first release, 1989's Flowing, was successful especially in the United States, hit song: "Ever Returning".

The second album Laguna de la Vera achieved top positions on the Billboard New Age Chart. Kochs tracks contributed to several US-Aids-benefit compilations among others together with Sting, Bonnie Raitt, Al Jarreau, Ottmar Liebert, Dave Grusin, Dave Stewart. The song "Touched by Love" from the Walking through Clouds album appears on a compilation in Belgium/Luxembourg Universal Music Group together with Ennio Morricone, Tony Bennett and Lang Lang.

The Weber State University in Ogden, Utah recommends his music as anti stress. Many airlines around the world apply his "music against fear of flying". The track "Childhood Hour", a piece from his record Walking through Clouds, was used in the award-winning movie “Shaniko” with Melissa Goad in 2008. All of his US releases were released by the Californian label Real Music (based in Sausalito near San Francisco). Since 2019 the label, including all previous albums and album Becoming, has been taken over by the new label  (Beverly Hills / LA).

The album Montagnola was recorded as a piano solo improvisation and is dedicated to the German Swiss writer Hermann Hesse. Koch has earned such awards as Piano Heaven Award in England and Audiophiles Highlight Award from STEREO in Germany. In 2012 he won the cultural prize from his hometown Wenden. Koch has published fourteen albums so far, the current release is called Becoming (Real Music, USA). Since 2016 Koch is an official member of The Recording Academy (National Academy of Recording Arts and Sciences,  NARAS) and thereby a Grammy Award voting member.

Discography

Studio albums 
 1989 - FLOWING
 1992 - LAGUNA DE LA VERA
 1995 - STILL MAGIC
 1997 - PICANTE (featuring Pablo/Brothers)
 1997 - FLOWING (new US-release by Real Music)
 1999 - JOURNEY TO THE HEART
 2005 - WALKING THROUGH CLOUDS
 2008 - MONTAGNOLA (Dedicated to Hermann Hesse)
 2009 - GENTLE SPIRIT
 2011 - SILENT STAR
 2013 - DAY OF LIFE
 2015 - REMEMBERING
 2016 - TOUCHED BY LOVE - A COLLECTION
 2017 - FILLED WITH LIGHT
 2020 - BECOMING (myndstream, USA)
 2022 - TREE TALES (Tree Tales Records/A-Train, USA)

Singles 

 2021 - FLOWING COLORS (May 7, 2021)
 2021 - LONELY DREAM (June 18, 2021) 
 2021 - LONELY DREAM - SOLO PIANO (July 2, 2021)
 2021 - THE WINDING PATH (July 30, 2021)
 2021 - SILENT LEAVES (August 31, 2021)
 2021 - AN OLD FAIRY TALE (November 19, 2021)

Other album appearances 
 1990 - THE WAVE 94.7 KTWV - WAVE AID 4
 1990 - KKSF 103.7 FM - SAMPLER FOR AIDS RELIEF 3
 1997 - ETERNITY: A ROMANTIC COLLECTION I + II
 1997 - TRANQUILITY
 1997 - PIANO DREAMERS
 2002 - SACRED SPA MUSIC SERIES
 2005 - REAL PIANO
 2006 - INSPARATION
 2009 - SACRED SPA MUSIC SERIES 2
 2014 - NAMASTE - HEALING
 2015 - ANGELS OF HOPE
 2016 - FOREST BATHING

Sheet Music 
 Walking through Clouds (track)
 Wonderful Glider

Music in Movie 
 Shaniko (2008) including Childhood Hour (track)

References 
 Bernward Koch at mainlypiano.com
 Bernward Koch interview at mwe3.com, October 2015

External links 
 Bernward Koch at Allmusic
 Bernward Koch Official Website
 Bernward Koch at myndstream (Real Music) Label - Overview
 Bernward Koch at Real Music (previously)

German keyboardists
German composers
1957 births
Living people
German pianists
People from Siegen
21st-century pianists